A fuel cell vehicle is a vehicle that uses a fuel cell to power an electric drive system. There are also hybrid vehicles meaning that they are fitted with a fuel cell and a battery or a fuel cell and an ultracapacitor. For HICEV see List of hydrogen internal combustion engine vehicles.  For a discussion of the advantages and disadvantages of fuel cell vehicles, see fuel cell vehicle.

Cars

Production
Cars commercially available for sale or leasing.

Demonstration fleets
Cars for testing and pre-production.
 1996 - Toyota FCHV-1
 1997 - Toyota FCHV-2
 1999 - Lotus Engineering Black Cab
 2000 - Ford Focus FCV
 2001 - Hyundai Santa Fe FCEV
 2001 - GM HydroGen3 / Opel HydroGen3
 2001 - Toyota FCHV-3
 2001 - Toyota FCHV-4
 2001 - Toyota FCHV-5
 2001 - Nissan X-Trail FCHV
 2004 - Audi A2H2
 2004 - Mercedes-Benz A-Class F-Cell, powered by Ballard Power Systems
 2005 - Fiat Panda Hydrogen
 2005 - Mazda Premacy Hydrogen RE Hybrid
 2007 - Chevrolet Equinox Fuel Cell / GM HydroGen4 also known as Opel HydroGen4 and Vauxhall HydroGen4
 2008 - Kia Borrego FCEV
 2008 - PSA H2Origin
 2008 - Renault Scenic ZEV H2
 2008 - Toyota FCHV-adv
 2010 - Mercedes-Benz B-Class F-Cell
 2016 - Roewe 950 Fuel Cell (plug-in hybrid fuel cell)
 2020 - Maxus EUNIQ 7 Minivan

Concept 

Alfa Romeo:
 2010 - Alfa Romeo MiTo FCEV

Audi:
 2009 - Audi Q5 FCEV
 2014 - Audi A7 h-tron quattro powered by Ballard Power Systems

BMW:
 2010 - BMW 1 Series Fuel-cell hybrid electric
 2012 - BMW i8 fuel-cell prototype
 2015 - BMW 5 Series GT (F07) eDrive Hydrogen Fuel Cell
 2019 - BMW i Hydrogen NEXT

Chang'an:
 2010 - Z-SHINE FCV

Chrysler:
 1999 - Jeep Commander
 2001 - Chrysler Natrium
 2003 - Jeep Treo

Daimler:

 1994 - Mercedes-Benz NECAR 1 based on Mercedes-Benz MB100
 1996 - Mercedes-Benz NECAR 2 based on Mercedes-Benz V-Class
 1997 - Mercedes-Benz NECAR 3, 4 (1999) and 5 (2000) based on Mercedes-Benz A-Class
 2002 - Mercedes-Benz NECAR F-Cell based on the Mercedes-Benz A-Class
 2005 - Mercedes-Benz F600 Hygenius
 2009 - Mercedes-Benz F-CELL Roadster
 2009 - Mercedes-Benz F-Cell based on the Mercedes-Benz B-Class
 2009 - Mercedes-Benz BlueZERO F-Cell

FAW Group:
 2010 - FAW Besturn B70 FCV

Fiat:
 2001 - Fiat Seicento Elettra H2 Fuel Cell
 2003 - Fiat Seicento Hydrogen
 2008 - Fiat Phyllis

Ford:
 2006 - F-250 Super Chief

General Motors:
 1966 - GM Electrovan
 2002 - GM HyWire
 2005 - GM Sequel

Gumpert Aiways Automobile:

 2018 - Nathalie (uses reformed methanol fuel cell)

Honda:
 1999–2001 - Honda FCX - FCXV1/FCXV2/FCXV3/FCXV4
 2002–2003 - Honda FCX powered by Ballard Power Systems - 2002 FCX and 2003 FCX

Hyundai:
 2005 - Hyundai Tucson FCEV
 2014 - Hyundai Intrado
 2022 - Hyundai N Vision 74

Maxus:
 2019 - Maxus G20FC - multi purpose vehicle (MPV)

Mazda:
 1997 - Mazda Demio FCEV
 2001 - Mazda Premacy FCEV (uses Reformed methanol fuel cell)

Mitsubishi:
 2004 - Mitsubishi FCV

Morgan:
 2005 - Morgan LIFEcar

Nissan:
 2012 - Nissan TeRRA

Peugeot:
 2004 - Peugeot Quark
 2006 - Peugeot 207 Epure

Riversimple:
 2009 - Riversimple Urban Car
 2016 - Riversimple Rasa

Ronn Motor Company:
 2008 - Ronn Motor Scorpion

SAIC:
2007 - Roewe 750 sedan FC.

Suzuki:
 2003 - Suzuki MR Wagon-FCV
 2003 - Suzuki Wagon R-FCV 
 2008 - Suzuki SX4-FCV

Toyota:

 1997 - Toyota FCHV-1
 1999 - Toyota FCHV-2
 2003 - Toyota Fine-S
 2003 - Toyota Fine-N
 2005 - Toyota Fine-T
 2005 - Toyota Fine-X
 2014 - Toyota FCV

Volkswagen:
 2000 - VW Bora Hy-motion
 2002 - VW Bora Hy-power
 2004 - VW Touran Hy-motion
 2007 - Volkswagen Tiguan HyMotion Fuel Cells
 2007 - VW space up! blue
 2008 - VW Passat Lingyu Hymotion
 2014 - Volkswagen Golf SportWagen HyMotion Fuel Cells
 2018 - Volkswagen Crafter HyMotion

Light commercial van

Production
 2017 - Maxus FCV80 light passenger (plug-in hybrid fuel cell)

Concept

Daimler:
 Mercedes-Benz Sprinter fuel cell van

Trains - locomotives

 2008 - NE Train
 2009 - Vehicle Projects HH20B
 2012 - University of Birmingham - Hydrogen Pioneer fuel cell locomotive
 2015 - Prototype fuel cell powered tram demonstrated by CSR Sifang Co Ltd.
 2017 - Tangshan - CRRC TRC developed the world's first commercial fuel cell hybrid tram and completed its first test run on Nanhu industrial tourism demonstration operation in 2017.
 2018 - Alstom - Coradia iLint is the world's only fuel cell passenger train which is put in commercial operation in November 2018.

Trucks

Production
 2020 - Hyundai Xcient Fuel Cell - world's first fuel cell truck.

Demonstration fleets
 2021 – Kenworth T680 FCEV - powered by a Toyota fuel cell (ZANZEFF project)
 2021 – Hino Dutro light-duty FCET - powered by the Toyota Mirai fuel cell

Concept

Nikola Motor Company:
 Nikola One
 Nikola Two
 Nicola Tre

Buses

Production
 2018 – Toyota Sora
 2020 – Hyundai Elec City FCEV bus

Demonstration fleets
 2018 - Sunwin SWB6128FCEV01 (seating capacity 18–24)

Concept

Daimler:
 Mercedes-Benz Citaro fuel cell bus

Dolomitech
 Minibus A50 16 seats 

Ford:
 Ford E350 fuel cell shuttle bus

ISE Corporation:
 FC-London Bus

New Flyer Industries:
 New Flyer H40LFR

Škoda:
 Škoda TriHyBus

Solaris:
 Solaris Urbino 12 hydrogen
 Solaris Trollino 18,75 H2

Tata:
 Tata Starbus fuel cell

Toyota:
 Toyota FCHV-BUS

University of Glamorgan, Wales:
 Tribid Bus

Van Hool:
 A300L
 

VDL:
Phileas

Wrightbus:
Wright Pulsar

Motorcycles 

Yamaha:
 2005 - Yamaha FC-me

Vessels 

 2000 - Hydra
 2003 - Duffy-Herreshoff watertaxi
 2003 - Yacht No. 1
 2004 - DeepC
 2004 - Yacht XV 1
 2004 - Hydrogen challenger
 2006 - Xperiance
 2007 - Tuckerboot
 2007 - Canal boat
 2008 - Zemships
 2017 - Energy Observer

 Submarines
 Type 212 submarine, Type 214 submarine (These are equipped with a diesel engine and fuel cell propulsion)-The silent switch.

Aircraft

 2008 - Aircraft, Boeing
 2015 - Drone, Intelligent Energy, UK tested successfully Drones with Hydrogen fuel cell engine.
 2016 - HY4 is the first passenger aircraft in Germany.

Racing vehicles
 2008 - Element One - fuel cell vehicle - an American fuel cell-powered race vehicle built for the 2008 Formula Zero Championship, the world's first hydrogen race series.
 2008 - Zero Emission Racing Team - fuel cell vehicle - Belgian team for Formula Zero Racing series.
 2008 - Forze I - fuel cell vehicle - Dutch team for Formula Zero Racing series.
 2009 - Forze II - fuel cell vehicle - Dutch team for Formula Zero Racing series.
 2009 - Buckeye Bullet 2 - fuel cell vehicle - American team for land speed records.
 2010 - Forze III - fuel cell vehicle - Dutch team for Formula Zero Racing series.
 2011 - Forze IV - fuel cell vehicle - Dutch team for Formula Student competition.
 2012 - Forze V - fuel cell vehicle - Dutch team for Formula Student competition.
 2013 - Concept Green GT H2 - fuel cell vehicle - French team for 24h of Le Mans.
 2013 - Concept Forze VI - fuel cell vehicle - Dutch team for CCRC Competition.
 2016 - Forze VII - fuel cell vehicle - Dutch studentteam which competes against petrol powered cars with a LMP3.

See also 
 Fuel cell vehicle
 List of hydrogen internal combustion engine vehicles
 Timeline of hydrogen technologies
 List of production battery electric vehicles
 Energy efficiency in transport
 Vehicular metrics

References

External links 
 Carchart, 2006
 Morrie's Mazda Blog post: 15 Years of hydrogen development, 2007

Fuel cell
Fuel cell vehicles